The dolphin genus Sotalia is considered to have two member species with the classification of Sotalia guianensis as a distinct species from Sotalia fluviatilis in 2007. This was a result of recent morphometric analyses, as well as mitochondrial DNA analysis.

Members of this genus are found in the Atlantic and Caribbean coasts of Central and South America as well as in the Amazon River and most of its tributaries.

Member species
 Sotalia fluviatilis (Gervais & Deville, 1853), Tucuxi
 Sotalia guianensis (van Bénéden, 1864), Costero or Guiana dolphin

References

Further reading

External links

 Whale and Dolphin Conservation Society (WDCS)

Oceanic dolphins
Cetacean genera
Taxa named by John Edward Gray